Blake Young may refer to:

 Kobe Tai (born 1972), former pornographic actress and adult model, sometimes credited as Blake Young
 Blake Young (motorcycle racer) (born 1987), American motorcycle racer
  Blake Young fka Young Chozen American Hip hop Artist